Bhattathiri are members of the Namboothiri community of Kerala, India. The Namboothiris (Malayalam :നമ്പൂതിരി) are the upper class Brahmins of Kerala, who consider themselves the most orthodox Brahmins in India.    Among that community, families attained the title of Bhattathiri in one of the three ways.

Three types of Bhattathiris
The three types of Bhattathiris are Saasthra Bhattathiris, Smaartha Bhattathiris and Bhaagavatha Bhattathiris. They are titles gained due to their scholarship.

Saasthra Bhattathiris (Meemaamsa Bhattathiris)
Historically, the foremost mission of Namboothiris has been the acquisition of knowledge, and careful application of that knowledge.  The Saasthra Bhattathiris are Namboothiris who received the "Bhatta" title after passing examinations on their scholarship in Sanskrit, Vedam, Linguistics, Astronomy, Astrology, Architecture, Meemaamsa, and Tharkam (logic). All of these Saasthra Namboothiris are from "Aadu" or "Edu" class, the elite Namboothiris.  Examples from the Aadu class would be the Polpaya Bhattathiripad, Pandamparambath Bhattathiripad, Kunnathur Padinjaredath Bhattathiripad, while Manjappatta Bhattathiripad and Avinjikkad Bhattathiripad would be examples from the Edu class.

Smaartha Bhattathiris
The Smaartha Bhattathiris specialize in conducting trials and interrogating suspects, only on Namboothiris.  The crimes would include treachery, theft, extra-marital affairs, and their job was almost like that of a present-day judge.  Based on their findings, the king or equally responsible person would pronounce the judgment.  This trial process was called "Jaathi Saasyam" or "Smaartha Vichaaram", and the expert conducting it was called Smaarthan or Smaartha Bhattathiri, so the term Bhattathiri in this instance has the meaning of "expert". "Smaartha Bhattathiris" are educated, qualified experts in Smaartha Vichaaram.  Examples of the Smaartha Bhattathiris are Pattachomaarath Bhattathiri, Vellakkaatt Bhattathiri and Kaavanaad Bhattathiri, all from either the "Aadu" or "Edu" classes.

Bhaagavatha Bhattathiri
Bhaagavatha Bhattathiris specialize in oratory and the recitation of "Puraanams", (epics) like Bhaagavatham. This was considered a great achievement among Namboothiris, thus ordinary people gave them the "Bhattathiri" title. Many families from various classes of Namboothiris gained the "Bhattathiri" title in this manner.  Aattupurath Bhattathiri, Karuvaatt Bhattathiri and several other families in various parts of Kerala belong to this category.

Alternate Origins
Another school of thought regarding the origin of the Bhattathiri, is that the original Bhatta Brahmins were the followers of Prabhakara Bhatta,  a contemporary of Adi Shankaracharya and the student of Kumarilla Bhatta, who established the Purva Mimamsa school of Hindu philosophy in Cheranadu. It is an accepted fact that all Brahmins in Kerala did not belong to the Nambuthiri community alone, nor did they arrive in the area at the same time. Brahmins from different places must have come to Kerala at various periods, as per the requirements of the then ruling dynasties.

External links
About Bhattadiris

Kerala society
Malayali Brahmins
Social groups of Kerala